The Federal Ministry of Commerce is a ministry department of the Nigerian government that regulates commerce.

Leadership

The ministry was headed by Nigerian Industrialist Charles Ugwuh from July 2007.
On October 29, 2008, President Umaru Yar'Adua sacked 20 members of his cabinet, including Charles Ugwuh.
In December Achike Udenwa was appointed Minister of Aviation.
As of December 2009, the Permanent Secretary was Dr A.K. Mohammed.

See also
Nigerian Civil Service
Federal Ministries of Nigeria

References

Federal Ministries of Nigeria
Economy of Nigeria